Ellon railway station was a railway station in Ellon, Aberdeenshire, Scotland.

History
Ellon Railway Station (originally Ellon for Cruden) was situated on the Formartine and Buchan Railway, which ran from Peterhead/Fraserburgh to Dyce (where it connected to the Great North of Scotland Railway to Aberdeen).

A few years after opening, Ellon Station became a junction station for the Boddam branch line line, which ran to Boddam via Cruden Bay. In its heyday the station had three platforms, two for the main line and one for the Boddam Branch. There was also a substantial goods yard. The branch line closed in 1932, and was used to store wagons until the track was lifted in 1950.

The station is situated in Auchterellon, about 1 mile from the town centre.

Ellon survived until 1965, when passenger services were withdrawn from the Formartine and Buchan Railway due to the Beeching Axe. The line was closed to freight in 1978, with the tracks being lifted soon afterwards.

The station today
The trackbed of the main line was initially preserved, before becoming the Formartine and Buchan Way, a long-distance cycle path. At the station site itself, no buildings survive, however the platforms and base of the water tower are still extant. A council depot was built on the former Goods Yard. The bridge over station road has been removed to the south, with the abutments being converted to allow graded access to cross the road.

As the Boddam Branch closed in 1932, with the track being lifted much earlier, most of the branch line within Ellon has been built on, by housing along Hospital Road, and the A948 Ellon Northern Bypass in 2001. However some of the trackbed is still visible from Golf Road, next to the McDonald Parklands housing estate.

References

Sources

External links
 RAILSCOT on Formartine and Buchan Railway

Disused railway stations in Aberdeenshire
Beeching closures in Scotland
Railway stations in Great Britain opened in 1861
Railway stations in Great Britain closed in 1965
Former Great North of Scotland Railway stations
1861 establishments in Scotland
1965 disestablishments in Scotland
Ellon, Aberdeenshire